Eiseb, also Eiseb Block, is a settlement in the Omaheke Region of Namibia. It is named after the Eiseb River, an ephemeral river (omuramba) in the Kalahari desert.

The settlement has been established in 1992 as a place where returning Ovambanderu and Ovaherero refugees from Botswana could settle. From 1994 onwards, Ovambanderu and Ovaherero from other reserved areas, such as Epukiro, Otjinene and Otjombinde moved in and make up the majority of the inhabitants , making a living from subsistence farming.

Eiseb-Epukiro River Basin
The area between Eiseb and Epukiro is one of eleven water basins in Namibia.

References

Populated places in the Omaheke Region
Populated places established in 1992
1992 establishments in Namibia
Landforms of Namibia
Drainage basins of Africa